The Borrowers is a Hallmark Hall of Fame TV special first broadcast in 1973 on NBC. The movie script was adapted from the 1952 Carnegie Medal-winning first novel of author Mary Norton's Borrowers series: The Borrowers.  The film stars Eddie Albert, Tammy Grimes and Judith Anderson. It was directed by Walter C. Miller.

In 1974, the special was awarded an Emmy for Outstanding Individual Achievement in Children's Programming and was nominated for Outstanding Children's Special (producers Duane Bogie, Walt deFaria and Warren Lockhart), Outstanding Individual Achievement in Children's Programming (performer Judith Anderson), Outstanding Individual Achievement in Children's Programming (performer Juul Haalmeyer) and Outstanding Individual Achievement in Children's Programming (director Walter C. Miller).

The special tells the story of the Clock Family, tiny people who live under the floorboards in a Victorian-era English house.

This movie is presently in the public domain.

Plot
The Clock Family are "borrowers," tiny people who live in the houses of regular sized "human beans" (a borrower mispronunciation of "human beings").  They survive by borrowing all they need from big people and try to keep their existence secret.  The main characters are a teenage borrower girl named Arriety Clock and her parents, Pod and Homily. During a borrowing expedition with her father and contrary to borrower nature, Arriety befriends the eight-year-old son of the house's human family; she slowly develops a friendship with him.

In a 19th-century English manor, the bedridden matriarch spends her time continually fortified with wine. She is attended by a strict housekeeper and an ancient groundskeeper. They are unaware of a few-centimeters-tall family of "borrowers" who have set up residence under the mansion's floorboards. The miniature family survive on various items which the father manages to lift during unseen expeditions aboveboard. The matriarch, Sophy, is actually aware of Pod, but, aware of her alcoholism, decides he is a delusion.

All seems well until Sophy is required to temporarily house an eight-year-old boy in her mansion. The boy happens to spot Mr Clock during a raid on a dollhouse, and he begins a series of events (including releasing a ferret under the floor to catch the tiny inhabitants) which cause the borrowers to flee into the countryside. However, they are eventually saved by a friendship which develops between the borrowers' daughter, Arrietty, and the boy, who becomes the family's champion.

Cast
 Eddie Albert as Pod Clock
 Tammy Grimes as Homily Clock
 Dame Judith Anderson as Great Aunt Sophy
 Karen Pearson as Arriety Clock
 Dennis Larson as The Boy
 Beatrice Straight as Mrs. Crampfurl
 Barnard Hughes as Mr. Crampfurl

Awards and reception
Emmy Awards
 1974 Outstanding Individual Achievement in Children's Programming (Won)
 1974 Outstanding Children's Special (producers Duane Bogie, Walt deFaria and Warren Lockhart) (Nominated)
 1974 Outstanding Individual Achievement in Children's Programming (performer Judith Anderson) (Nominated)
 1974 Outstanding Individual Achievement in Children's Programming (costume designer Juul Haalmeyer) (Nominated)
 1974 Outstanding Individual Achievement in Children's Programming (director Walter C. Miller) (Nominated)

Reviewers generally found the movie a good message for its intended audience of young viewers, but a mediocre watch for adult tastes. One wrote: "(The) teleplay follows a delightful path as the Clock family wriggles free of trouble, and the values that Pod [the Clock family patriarch] represents — as compared to the fearfulness and small-mindedness of the story’s normal-sized grown-ups — comprise a lovely message for young viewers." Another wrote: "Eddie Albert plays his father character a little too broadly for my tastes. Overall, I wasn’t too impressed with either the script or the acting. It’s watchable, but could have been a lot better."

Filming locations
 Toad Hall, Whitby, Ontario

See also
List of films featuring miniature people

References

External links
 
 

1973 television films
1973 films
Films based on children's books
Peabody Award-winning broadcasts
The Borrowers
American fantasy films
American television films
Hallmark Hall of Fame episodes
Television shows directed by Walter C. Miller
1970s fantasy films
1970s English-language films
1970s American films